The Western Water Catchment is a planning area located in the West Region of Singapore. The planning area borders Tuas and Pioneer to its south, Sungei Kadut, Choa Chu Kang and Tengah to its east, Jurong West to its southeast, Lim Chu Kang to its north and the Straits of Johor to its west. It is the largest planning area by land area, covering nearly a tenth of Singapore Island. It is also one of the two main water catchments in Singapore, the other being Central Water Catchment.

The area currently houses four reservoirs, Tengeh Reservoir, Poyan Reservoir, Murai Reservoir and Sarimbun Reservoir. Part of the Western Water Catchment is also a live-firing area in which it is used by the Singapore Armed Forces for training purposes. 

The SAFTI Live Firing Area commenced operations in 1968 and was revamped in 2008, the eastern part began operations in 2002 and has been extended to Lim Chu Kang Tracks 11 and 13.

History
The SAFTI Live Firing Area was drawn out in 1967, Before the drawing-up and gazetting of the live-firing zone, most residents and occupants living within the affected boundaries were shifted to Boon Lay as its pioneer residents and factories there were relocated to the Jurong Industrial Area, leaving only a few villages behind (all were gone by the early 1990s). On 14 July 1968, four villagers died and nine others were injured in the live-firing area (near Kampong Berih, one of many rural villages in the area) and seven other villagers snuck into Pasir Laba (on the coastline of the Johor Straits) by sampans to pick durians and rambutans from the many fruit trees in the forest there. These villagers were injured by mortar rounds in their attempt to collect fruits. There are many cases of trespassers in the live firing area.

Previously, there was also a military fort called Pasir Laba Battery as a WWII gun battery from 1936 to 1942. It was therefore demolished in 1970s although it is located at both Wrexham and Bajau area. Several of the WWII gun battery historical remains were seen at the junction of Wrexham Drive and Wrexham Road.

Infrastructure

Military
There are seven main military bases in the Western Water Catchment. These include Pasir Laba Camp, Choa Chu Kang Camp at Lorong Danau (where the RSAF's 201 Squadron is based; it has Fighter control, SAM control, Surveillance and ASP), Sungei Gedong Camp (HQ Armour), Kranji Camp II & III, Mowbray Camp (SAF MP Command) and Tengah Air Base. A military aerostat, widely referred to as a blimp locally, is tethered to the ground at Choa Chu Kang Camp as part of testing for use as long-range air defence radar in Singapore. Additionally, there are various live-firing ranges in the Western Water Catchment; these include the Multi-Mission Range Complex, MATADOR Range, M203 Range, several SAFTI ranges and the Poyan 300m Range.

In the Murai area, there are more military training areas which are the Murai Urban Live Firing Facility (MULFAC), Murai Urban Training Facility (MUTF) and MEXCON. These will be affected under the proposed Lim Chu Kang Road realignment project for the expanded Tengah Air Base, along with the construction of the new SAFTI City. The facility was located within an existing training area in Lim Chu Kang, in the vicinity of Jalan Murai. The MUTF is built to resemble a typical town, and has features such as single-level houses; a commercial district comprising multi-function, multi-storey buildings; a residential district; as well as an industrial district. The MUTF was permanently closed in 26 August 2022 to be given for the construction of the new Lim Chu Kang Road and Tengah Airbase, with training being shifted to SAFTI City. The stretch of Lim Chu Kang Road between Neo Tiew Road and Old Choa Chu Kang Road will be permanently closed and given to make way for an expanded Tengah Air Base.

Home Team
Western Water Catchment houses the Home Team Academy (HTA), which is located along Old Choa Chu Kang Road, and the Civil Defence Academy (CDA), which is located along Jalan Bahar, next to the Muslim cemetery. The SPF ProCom (Protective Security Command) camp is located at Mowbray road, adjacent to the SAF Mowbray Camp.

Education
Western Water Catchment houses the main campus of Nanyang Technological University and National Institute of Education, located at the boundary with Jurong West.

Cemetery
Western Water Catchment houses the Choa Chu Kang Cemetery, which is the largest cemetery in Singapore. It is located at the junction of the Old Choa Chu Kang Road, Lim Chu Kang Road and Jalan Bahar. Within its grounds, are several columbaria, including the state-run Choa Chu Kang Columbarium, and two private facilities, namely The Garden of Remembrance, a Christian columbarium and Ji Le Memorial Park, a Buddhist facility.

Reservoirs
This water catchment has 4 reservoirs.

Tengeh Reservoir

Tengeh Reservoir (Malay: Tadahan Air Tengeh; Chinese: 登格蓄水池) was formerly a river, Sungei Tengeh, which emptied into the Straits of Johor and was dammed to become a reservoir in the early 1980s (which is part of Western Water Catchment Scheme). It is located at Wrexham and Bajau districts. Construction of the reservoir began on 11 March 1977.

Tengeh Reservoir is part of the SAFTI Live Firing Area (South) and has restricted access since 19 January 1992. 

The southern side of Tengeh Reservoir is the Raffles Country Club, and the golf areas can see the reservoir clearly. The Raffles Country Club construction began on 29 October 1987. The government of Singapore has made the second large acquisition of land for the project by requiring Raffles Country Club to vacate its plot as the site offers the "most suitable location" to run the HSR tracks after the bridge crossing and to place the tunnel portal leading to the tunnels that would take the HSR to the Jurong East terminus. The site has to be vacated by July 31, 2018, to be used for HSR crossov.er tracks and a siding facility to temporarily house a train near the border for safety or operational reasons.

On 3 November 2011, Public Utilities Board (PUB) and Economic Development Board (EDB) decided to install floating solar panels at Tengeh Reservoir, which is part of S$11 million project. The 60 MW facility was operational in July 2021.

Poyan Reservoir

Poyan Reservoir (Malay: Tadahan Air Poyan; Chinese: 波扬蓄水池) was previously part of the river Sungei Poyan and its delta, which was dammed to become a reservoir. Sungei Poyan emptied into the Straits of Johor. It is located in SAFTI City, Poyan and Bajau districts. Construction of the reservoir began on 11 March 1977.

At the same year, Mediacorp has filmed the drama "Behind Bars" (Season 1 Episode 28) at that location, the Poyan Temple was there, as "Temple Hill". However, at that location, there is only a money train visible at the location since 2008.

It is part of SAFTI Live Firing Area (South), which has restricted access. In April 2019, some of the roads at Poyan Reservoir were also named - Poyan Drive, Poyan Avenue, SAFTI City Avenue and Danau Grove.

At the reservoir, only the Mobility 3rd Generation raft is deployed to load and unload military vehicles when crossing from the western side to the eastern side.

Murai Reservoir

Murai Reservoir (Malay: Tadahan Air Murai) was formerly Sungei Murai, which was dammed in early 1980s, to create a reservoir. It is located in Murai, Murai North and Thousand Oaks districts. Construction work had begun in November 1977.

It is part of SAFTI Live Firing Area (North), of which is restricted to only from the TRMC Operations Room. The Murai Urban Training Facility is east of Murai Reservoir, which can be accessed through Jalan Murai from Lim Chu Kang Road, together with the Murai Urban Live Firing Facility (MULFF).

There is also a road east of Murai Urban Training Facility which goes from Lim Chu Kang Road to Jalan Murai, called Murai Farmway. Only Murai Farmway and part of Jalan Murai is opened to the public. Access to the area and the reservoir has been restricted since October 1999. Murai North has four dirt roads named (with Lim Chu Kang Tracks 11 & 13).

Sarimbun Reservoir

Sarimbun Reservoir (Malay: Tadahan Air Sarimbun; Chinese: 莎琳汶蓄水池) was constructed by damming Sungei Sarimbun and widening of Sungei Karang, Sungei Hantu, and Sungei Sarimbun. It is located in Sarimbun, Sungei Gedong, Bahtera and Kapal districts. Construction work began in November 1977.

It is part of SAFTI Live Firing Area in the north, which has restricted access since 19 January 1992 and only accessible through the TRMC Operations Room. The gate is accessible through the road named Jalan Bahtera. The public can cut through from Bahtera Track to enter Sarimbun Reservoir area.

Sarimbun was where General Tomoyuki Yamashita landed his troops during World War II, and was engaged in the Battle of Sarimbun Beach. Sarimbun is also home to many small vegetable and fruit farms and health farms. Sarimbun also hosts multiple permanent campsites, especially on Jalan Bahtera. These campsites include the Singapore Scout Association's Sarimbun Campsite, Girl Guides Singapore's Camp Christine, and Ministry of Education's Jalan Bahtera Adventure Centre.

Etymology
Sarimbun is a Malay place name, and existed probably since the early nineteenth century. The Franklin and Jackson's Plan of Singapore (1830) refers to Sungei Sarimbun, or Sarimbun River in Malay, as "Serimhone".

Rimbun means "luxuriant", "in great quantity" or "thick".

Other place names with Sarimbun include Pulau Sarimbun, a small island in the Straits of Johor off the coast at Sarimbun. Pulau Sarimbun is within the SAFTI Live Firing Area as shown in the map.

Islands
There are three islands in the Western Water Catchment - Pulau Bajau, Pulau Pergam and Pulau Sarimbun. Pulau Bajau is a hypsographic island within Poyan Reservoir. It is part of the SAFTI live firing area.

Etymology
Pulau Bajau means Bajau island, in which Bajau is an indigenous ethnic group residing in the state of Sabah in east Malaysia, Indonesia and southern Philippines.

Transport

Bus
Western Catchment Area has very few public bus connections in the vicinity – 172, 179, 199, 405 and 975. Bus services 179 and 199 operates from Boon Lay Bus Interchange and provides bus connections between NTU and nearby MRT stations, Boon Lay and Pioneer. Service 172, which operates between Choa Chu Kang and Boon Lay interchanges, serves the military and Home Team installations along Jalan Bahar and Old Choa Chua Kang Road, while service 975 serves Choa Chua Kang Cemetery and the various military/Home Team installations along Old Choa Chu Kang Road, Old Lim Chu Kang Road and Lim Chu Kang Road with connections to Choa Chu Kang and Bukit Panjang MRT/LRT stations. Service 405, which operates from Boon Lay interchange, predominantly serves the Choa Chu Kang Cemetery and only operates on selected days of the year, namely at the eves of certain festivals in Singapore. Besides public bus services, NTU internal campus shuttle buses provide a free alternative to public buses for commutes between Pioneer MRT station and NTU as well as within the campus.

MRT
There are currently no operational MRT stations within Western Water Catchment. Tawas, Nanyang Gateway, Nanyang Crescent and Peng Kang Hill stations of the upcoming Jurong Region line (JRL) are currently under construction and will be completed by 2029. These stations will improve accessibility between NTU, CleanTech Park and Jurong West.

References